U.S. Route 23 (US 23) is a  United States Numbered Highway in the state of Kentucky. It travels from the Virginia state line near Jenkins to the Ohio state line west of South Shore via Jenkins, Pikeville, Coal Run Village, Prestonsburg, Paintsville, Louisa, Catlettsburg, Ashland, Russell, Flatwoods, Raceland, Wurtland, Greenup, and South Shore.

Route description
US 23 enters Kentucky at the Virginia state line southeast of Jenkins. After a little over a mile, it intersects US 119 at a partial interchange on the Jenkins city line, and US 119 runs concurrently with US 23. The highway then head in a northeasterly direction, bypassing Jenkins. The two then meet US 460 at another partial interchange along the Levisa Fork in extreme southern Pikeville, and US 460 also joins the concurrency. The highway bypasses Pikeville along the Pikeville Cut-Through before US 119 splits off to the east. US 23/US 460 begins running northeast through Coal Run Village and around both Prestonsburg and Paintsville, where US 460 splits off to the west northwest of Paintsville. US 23 then begins running northeastward, before easing into a northerly direction, bypassing Louisa, after which it begins paralleling the Big Sandy River. The route intersects Interstate 64 (I-64) next to the Catlettsburg Refinery before entering the town of Catlettsburg, where it begins a concurrency with US 60. The highway continues north before curving to the northwest to enter Ashland, where US 60 splits off. After Ashland, US 23 continues to run northwestward, paralleling the Ohio River, and running through or around the towns of Russell, Flatwoods, Raceland, Wurtland, and Greenup. After Greenup, it switches to a more northward direction in parallel with the Ohio River before making  a sharp change to the west, after which it enters South Shore. Just west of South Shore, US 23 meets the eastern terminus of the eastern segment of Kentucky Route 8 (HY 8), where it turns north and crosses into Portsmouth, Ohio, via the U.S. Grant Bridge across the Ohio River.

Major intersections

See also

Special routes of U.S. Route 23

References

External links

 Kentucky
23
U.S. Route 23 in Kentucky
Transportation in Letcher County, Kentucky
Transportation in Pike County, Kentucky
Transportation in Floyd County, Kentucky
Transportation in Johnson County, Kentucky
Transportation in Lawrence County, Kentucky
Transportation in Boyd County, Kentucky
Transportation in Greenup County, Kentucky